Bill VanPatten is a former Professor of Spanish and Second Language Acquisition at Michigan State University.  He specializes in second language acquisition, which he investigates on both theoretical and practical levels, using techniques from psycholinguistics, applied linguistics, and cognitive psychology.

Research
VanPatten was the creator of the educational television show Destinos, which is designed for use with Spanish courses.

He worked with the theory of input processing in second language acquisition, which aims to offer an explanation on how L2 learners process input. This term was first used by professor Bill VanPatten. Since he grew up in a multilingual home environment he strongly believes in the huge benefits being able to speak, read and write. VanPatten considered that most people have looked at language as something static, therefore there is a rule to learn it by practicing and then when it is relevant enough it sticks in your head.

However, VanPatten considers that in learning language, first you have to process language by hearing and reading in order to get enough data to build up the linguistic system over time. To exemplify this theory, VanPatten mentions that you just have to give people a couple of chunks of language and make them do something with them so that they can to process language, thus demonstrating how language develops in the brain.

Bibliography 

 Dust Storm: Stories from Lubbock
 From Input To Output: A Teacher's Guide to Second Language Acquisition
 Making Communicative Language Teaching Happen (with James F. Lee)
 Theories in Second Language Acquisition: An Introduction (with Jessica Williams)
 Key Terms in Second Language Acquisition (with Alessandro G. Benati)
 Studies in Second Language Acquisition (with Susan Gass)
 ''Research in Second Language Processing and Parsing" (with Jill Jegerski)

References

External links
Giving adult language learners wings to fly (and acquire): Van Patten responds to Robert O'Neill's criticisms of SLA theory
 Hispania White Paper: Where are the experts? (Hispania 98.1 (2015): 2–13)

Year of birth missing (living people)
Living people
Applied linguists
Bilingualism and second-language acquisition researchers
Michigan State University faculty